Aldehyde dehydrogenases are a group of enzymes that catalyse the oxidation of aldehydes. They convert aldehydes (R–C(=O)) to carboxylic acids (R–C(=O)). The oxygen comes from a water molecule.  To date, nineteen ALDH genes have been identified within the human genome. These genes participate in a wide variety of biological processes including the detoxification of exogenously and endogenously generated aldehydes.

Function 

Aldehyde dehydrogenase is a polymorphic enzyme responsible for the oxidation of aldehydes to carboxylic acids, which leave the liver and are metabolized by the body’s muscle and heart. There are three different classes of these enzymes in mammals: class 1 (low Km, cytosolic), class 2 (low Km, mitochondrial), and class 3 (high Km, such as those expressed in tumors, stomach, and cornea).  In all three classes, constitutive and inducible forms exist.   ALDH1 and ALDH2 are the most important enzymes for aldehyde oxidation, and both are tetrameric enzymes composed of 54 kDa subunits.  These enzymes are found in many tissues of the body but are at the highest concentration in the liver.

Active site

The active site of the aldehyde dehydrogenase enzyme is largely conserved throughout the different classes of the enzyme and, although the number of amino acids present in a subunit can change, the overall function of the site changes little. The active site binds to one molecule of an aldehyde and one molecule of either NAD+ or NADP+, which functions as a cofactor. Cysteine and glutamate molecules interact with the aldehyde substrate. Many other residues will interact with NAD(P)+ to hold it in place. Magnesium may be used to help the enzyme function, although the degree to which magnesium assists the enzyme varies between different classes of aldehydes.

Mechanism
The overall reaction catalysed by the aldehyde dehydrogenases is:

 RCHO + NAD+ + H2O → RCOOH + NADH + H+

In this NAD(P)+-dependent reaction, the aldehyde enters the active site through a channel extending from the surface of the enzyme. The active site contains a Rossmann fold, and interactions between the cofactor and the fold allow for the action of the active site.

A sulfur from a cysteine in the active site makes a nucleophilic attack on the carbonyl carbon of the aldehyde.  The hydrogen is kicked off as a hydride and attacks NAD(P)+ to make NAD(P)H.  The enzyme's active site then goes through an isomorphic change whereby the NAD(P)H is moved, creating room for a water molecule to access the substrate.  The water is primed by a glutamate in the active site, and the water makes a nucleophilic attack on the carbonyl carbon, kicking off the sulfur as a leaving group.

Researchers at the University of Tsukuba found that durian extract inhibited aldehyde dehydrogenase activity, lending credence to an Asian folklore warning against consuming durian with alcohol.

Pathology (aldehyde dehydrogenase deficiency)
ALDH2 plays a crucial role in maintaining low blood levels of acetaldehyde during alcohol oxidation. In this pathway (ethanol to acetaldehyde to acetate), the intermediate structures can be toxic, and health problems arise when those intermediates cannot be cleared. When high levels of acetaldehyde occur in the blood, facial flushing, lightheadedness, palpitations, nausea, and general “hangover” symptoms occur. These symptoms are indicative of a medical condition known as the alcohol flush reaction, also known as “Asian flush” or “Oriental flushing syndrome”.

There is a mutant form of aldehyde dehydrogenase, termed ALDH2*2, wherein a lysine residue replaces a glutamate in the active site at position 487 of ALDH2.  Homozygous individuals with the mutant allele have almost no ALDH2 activity, and those heterozygous for the mutation have reduced activity.  Thus, the mutation is partially dominant. The ineffective homozygous allele works at a rate of about 8% of the normal allele, for it shows a higher Km for NAD+ and has a higher maximum velocity than the wild-type allele.  This mutation is common in Japan, where 41% of a non-alcoholic control group were ALDH2 deficient, where only 2–5% of an alcoholic group were ALDH2-deficient.  In Taiwan, the numbers are similar, with 30% of the control group showing the deficiency and 6% of alcoholics displaying it.  The deficiency is manifested by slow acetaldehyde removal, with low alcohol tolerance perhaps leading to a lower frequency of alcoholism.

These symptoms are the same as those observed in people who drink while being treated by the drug disulfiram, which is why disulfiram is used to treat alcoholism.  The patients show higher blood levels of acetaldehyde, and become violently ill upon consumption of even small amounts of alcohol. Several drugs (e.g., metronidazole) cause a similar reaction known as "disulfiram-like reaction."

Yokoyama et al. found that decreased enzyme activity of aldehyde dehydrogenase-2, caused by the mutated ALDH2 allele, contributes to a higher chance of esophageal and oropharyngolaryngeal cancers.  The metabolized acetaldehyde in the blood, which is six times higher than in individuals without the mutation, has shown to be a carcinogen in lab animals.  ALDH2*2 is associated with increased odds of oropharyngolaryngeal, esophageal, gastric, colon, and lung cancer.  However, they found no connection between increased levels of ALDH2*2 in the blood and an increased risk of liver cancer.

Demir et al. found that ALDH1 is a potentially important, poor prognostic factor in breast cancer, associated with high histological grade, estrogen/progesteron receptor negativity and HER2 positivity.

Some case-control studies claimed that carriage of ALDH2*2 allele was a risk of late-onset Alzheimer's disease independent of the apolipoprotein E gene (the odds for LOAD in carriers of ALDH2*2 allele almost twice that of non-carriers). Moreover, ALDH gene, protein expression and activity are substantially decreased in the substantia nigra of Parkinson's disease patients. These reports are in line with findings implementing toxic lipid oxidation-derived aldehydes in these diseases and in neurodegeneration in general.

Fitzmaurice et al. explored aldehyde dehydrogenase inhibition as a pathogenic mechanism in Parkinson disease. "This ALDH model for PD etiology may help explain the selective vulnerability of dopaminergic neurons in PD and provide a potential mechanism through which environmental toxicants contribute to PD pathogenesis."

Knockout mouse models further confirm the involvement of ALDH family in neurodegeneration. Mice null for ALDH1a1 and ALDH2 exhibit Parkinson's disease-like age-dependent deficits in motor performance and significant increase in biogenic aldehydes.

The ALDH2-/- mice display age-related memory deficits in various tasks, as well as endothelial dysfunction, brain atrophy, and other Alzheimer's disease-associated pathologies, including marked increases in lipid peroxidation products, amyloid-beta, p-tau and activated caspases. These behavioral and biochemical Alzheimer's disease-like deficits were efficiently ameliorated when the ALDH2-/- mice were treated with isotope-reinforced, deuterated polyunsaturated fatty acids (D-PUFA).

Genes
 ALDH1A1, ALDH1A2, ALDH1A3, ALDH1B1, ALDH1L1, ALDH1L2
 ALDH2
 ALDH3A1, ALDH3A2, ALDH3B1, ALDH3B2
 ALDH4A1, ALDH5A1, ALDH6A1, ALDH7A1, ALDH8A1, ALDH9A1, ALDH16A1, ALDH18A1

See also 
 Alcohol dehydrogenase

References

External links 
 

Enzymes
EC 1.2.1